Aulidiotis bicolor is a species of moth in the family Gelechiidae. It was described by Sigeru Moriuti in 1977. It is found in Japan, where it has been recorded from Yakushima island.

References

Gelechiinae
Moths described in 1977
Moths of Japan